The saola (Pseudoryx nghetinhensis), also called spindlehorn, Asian unicorn, or infrequently, Vu Quang bovid, is one of the world's rarest large mammals, a forest-dwelling bovine native to the Annamite Range in Vietnam and Laos. It was described in 1993 following a discovery of remains in Vũ Quang National Park by a joint survey of the Vietnamese Ministry of Forestry and the World Wide Fund for Nature. Saolas have since been kept in captivity multiple times, although only for short periods as they died within a matter of weeks to months. The species was first reported in 1992 by Do Tuoc, a forest ecologist, and his associates. The first photograph of a living saola was taken in captivity in 1993. The most recent one was taken in 2013 by a movement-triggered camera in the forest of central Vietnam. It is the only species in genus Pseudoryx.

Taxonomy

In May 1992, the Ministry of Forestry, Vietnam sent a survey team to examine the biodiversity of the newly established Vu Quang National Park. On this team were Do Tuoc, Le Van Cham and Vu Van Dung (of the Forest Inventory and Planning Institute); Nguyen Van Sang (of the Institute of Ecological and Biological Resources); Nguyen Thai Tu (of Vinh University); and John MacKinnon (of the World Wildlife Fund). On 21 May, the team procured a skull featuring a pair of strange, long and pointed horns from a local hunter. They came across a similar pair in the Annamite Range in the northeastern region of the reserve the following day. The team ascribed these features to a new bovid species, calling it the "saola" or the "Vu Quang ox" to avoid confusion with the sympatric serow. The WWF officially announced the discovery of the new species on 17 July 1992.

According to biodiversity specialist Tony Whitten, though Vietnam boasts a variety of flora and fauna, many of which have been recently described, the discovery of as large an animal as the saola was quite unexpected. The saola was the first large mammal to be discovered in the area for 50 years. Observations of live saola have been few and far between, restricted to the Annamite Range.

The scientific name of the saola is Pseudoryx nghetinhensis. It is the sole member of the genus Pseudoryx and is classified under the family Bovidae. The species was first described in 1993 by Vu Van Dung, Do Tuoc, biologists Pham Mong Giao and Nguyen Ngoc Chinh, Peter Arctander of the University of Copenhagen and John MacKinnon. The discovery of saola remains in 1992 generated huge scientific interest due to the animal's special physical traits. The saola differs significantly from all other bovid genera in appearance and morphology, enough to place it in its own genus (Pseudoryx).

A recent sequencing study of ribosomal mitochondrial DNA of a large taxon sample divides the bovid family into two major subfamilial clades. The first clade is the subfamily Bovinae consisting of three tribes: Bovini (cattle and buffaloes, including the saola), Tragelaphini (Strepsicerotini) (African spiral-horned bovids) and Boselaphini (the nilgai and four-horned antelope). The second clade is the subfamily Antelopinae, which includes all other bovids. Antelopinae is composed of the three tribes: Caprini (goats, sheep, and muskox), Hippotragini (horse-like antelopes), and Antilopini (gazelles).

Since its physical traits are so complex to classify, Pseudoryx had been classified variously as member of the subfamily Caprinae and as belonging to any of the three tribes of the subfamily Bovinae: Boselaphini, Bovini and Tragelaphini. DNA analysis has led scientists to place the saola as a member of the tribe Bovini. The morphology of its horns, teeth and some other features indicate it should be grouped with less-derived or more ancestral bovids. Scientific consensus may lead to classifying the saola as the sole member of a proposed new tribe, Pseudorygini.

Etymology
The name 'saola' has been translated as "spindle[-horned]", although the precise meaning is actually "spinning-wheel post horn". The name comes from a Tai language of Vietnam. The meaning is the same in Lao language (also spelled  /sǎo-lǎː/ in Lao). The specific name nghetinhensis refers to the two Vietnamese provinces of Nghệ An and Hà Tĩnh, while Pseudoryx acknowledges the animal's similarities with the Arabian or African oryx. The Hmong people in Laos refer to the animal as saht-supahp, a term derived from Lao ( /sàt supʰáːp/) meaning "the polite animal", because it moves quietly through the forest. Other names used by minority groups in the saola's range are lagiang (Van Kieu), a ngao (Ta Oi) and xoong xor (Katu)  In the press, saolas have been referred to as "Asian unicorns", an appellation apparently due to its rarity and reported gentle nature, and perhaps because both the saola and the oryx have been linked with the unicorn. No known link exists with the Western unicorn myth or the "Chinese unicorn", the qilin.

Description

In a 1998 publication, William G. Robichaud, the coordinator of the Saola Working Group, recorded physical measurements for a captive female saola he dubbed 'Martha', in a Laotian menagerie. She was observed for around 15 days until she died from unknown causes. The general characteristics of the saola, as shown by studies during 1993–5 as well as the 1998 study, include a chocolate brown coat with patches of white on the face, throat and the sides of the neck, a paler shade of brown on the neck and the belly, a black dorsal stripe, and a pair of nearly parallel horns, present on both sexes.

While the hair was found to be short on the head and the neck, it thickened to woolly hair on the insides of the forelegs and the belly. Studies before 1998 reported a hint of red in the inspected skins. The neck and the belly are a paler shade of brown compared to the rest of the body. The tail, which measured  in Robichaud's specimen, is divided into three horizontal bands, brown at the base, black at the tip and white in the middle. This adaptation is thought to protect against both predators and rivals' horns during fights.

The maxillary glands of the saola are probably the largest among those of all other animals. The glands are covered by a thick, pungent, grayish green, semi-solid secretion beneath which lies a sheath of few flat hairs. Robichaud observed several pores, used probably for secretion, on the upper surface of the lid. These secretions are typically rubbed against the underside of vegetation, leaving a musky, pungent paste.

Both sexes possess slightly divergent horns that are similar in appearance and form almost the same angle with the skull, but differ in their lengths. Horns resemble the parallel wooden posts locally used to support a spinning wheel (thus the familiar name "spindlehorn"). These are generally dark-brown or black and about 35–50 cm long; twice the length of their head. While studies prior to Robichaud's claim the horns are uniformly circular in cross-section, Robichaud observed his specimen had horns with a nearly oval cross-section. The sides of the base of the horns is rugged and indented.

Distribution and habitat 
The saola has one of the smallest ranges of any large mammal. It inhabits wet evergreen or deciduous forests in eastern Southeast Asia, preferring river valleys. During the winters, it migrates to the lowlands.

Ecology and behaviour

Local people reported that the saola is active in the day as well as at night, but prefers resting during the hot midday hours. Robichaud noted that the captive female was active mainly during the day, but pointed out that the observation could have been influenced by the unfamiliar surroundings the animal found herself in. When she rested, she would draw her forelegs inward to her belly, extend her neck so that her chin touched the ground, and close her eyes. Though apparently solitary, saola have been reported in groups of two or three as well as up to six or seven. Grouping patterns of the saola resemble those of the bushbuck, anoa, and sitatunga.

Robichaud observed that the captive female was calm in the presence of humans, but was afraid of dogs. On an encounter with a dog, she would resort to snorting and thrust her head forward, pointing her horns at her opponent. Her erect ears pointed backward, and she stood stiffly with her back arched. Meanwhile, she hardly paid any attention to her surroundings. This female was found to urinate and defecate separately, dropping her hind legs and lowering her lower body – a common observation among bovids. She would spend considerable time grooming herself with her strong tongue. Marking behaviour in the female involved opening up the flap of the maxillary gland and leaving a pungent secretion on rocks and vegetation. She would give out short bleats occasionally.

Diet
Robichaud offered spleenwort (Asplenium), Homalomena, and various species of broad-leaved shrubs or trees of the family Sterculiaceae to the captive animal. The saola fed on all plants, and showed a preference for the Sterculiaceae species. She did not pull at leaves, she would rather chew or pull them into her mouth using her long tongue. She fed mainly during the day, and rarely in the dark. The saola is also reputed to feed on Schismatoglottis, unlike other herbivores in its range.

Reproduction
Very little information is available about the reproductive cycle of the saola. The saola is likely to have a fixed mating season, from late August to mid-November; only single calf births have been documented, mainly during summer between mid-April and late June. In the absence of more specific data, the gestation period has been estimated as similar to that of Tragelaphus species, about 33 weeks. Three reports of saola killings from nearby villagers involved young accompanying mothers.

Conservation
The saola is currently considered to be critically endangered. Its restrictive habitat requirements and aversion to human proximity are likely to endanger it through habitat loss and habitat fragmentation. Saola suffer losses through local hunting and the illegal trade in furs, traditional medicines, and for use of the meat in restaurants and food markets. They also sometimes get caught in snares that have been set to catch animals raiding crops, such as wild boar, sambar, and muntjac. More than 26,651 snares have so far been removed from saola habitats by conservation groups.

The key feature of the area occupied by the saola is its remoteness from human disturbance. Saola are shot for their meat, but hunters also gain high esteem in the village for the production of a carcass. Due to the scarcity, the locals place much more value on the saola than more common species. Because the people in this area are traditional hunters, their attitude about killing the saola is hard to change; this makes conservation difficult. The intense interest from the scientific community has actually motivated hunters to capture live specimens. Commercial logging has been stopped in the nature reserve area of Bu Huong, and there is an official ban on forest clearance within the boundaries of the reserve.

Species of conservation concern are frequently hard to study; there are often delays in implementing or identifying necessary conservation needs due to lack of data. Because the species is so rare, there is a continuous lack of adequate data; this is one of the major problems facing saola conservation. Trained scientists have never observed saola in the wild. Unfortunately, because it is unlikely that intact saola populations exist, field surveys to discover these populations are not a conservation priority.

The Saola Working Group was formed by the IUCN Species Survival Commission's Asian Wild Cattle Specialist Group, in 2006 to protect the saolas and their habitat. This coalition includes about 40 experts from the forestry departments of Laos and Vietnam, Vietnam's Institute of Ecology and Biological Resources, Vinh University, biologists and conservationists from Wildlife Conservation Society, and the World Wide Fund for Nature.

A group of scientists from the Vietnam Academy of Science and Technology in central Hanoi, within the Institute of Biotechnology, investigated a last resort effort of conserving the species by cloning, an extremely difficult approach even in the case of well-understood species. However, the lack of female saola donors of enucleated ovocytes and receptive females, as well as the interspecific barriers, greatly compromise the potential success of the cloning technique.

Culture

The mascot of the 2021 Southeast Asian Games is Sao La. This design by Ngô Xuân Khôi defeated 557 other mascot submissions to emerge as the winner of the 2019 searching contest.

See also
 Leaf muntjac (Muntiacus putaoensis)
 Truong Son muntjac (Muntiacus truongsonensis) 
 Giant muntjac (Muntiacus vuquangensis)
 Annamite striped rabbit (Nesolagus timminsi)

References

Sources

Further reading
 Shuker, Karl P.N. The New Zoo: New and Rediscovered Animals of the Twentieth Century, House of Stratus, 2002

External links

 Saola Foundation
 savethesaola.org, Saola Working Group Website
 Rare antelope-like mammal caught in Asia at BBC News
 Images and movies of the saola (Pseudoryx nghetinhensis) at ARKive
 Saola factsheet at Ultimate Ungulate
 Vu Quang Ox - Pseudoryx nghetinhensis from the United Nations Environment Programme World Conservation Monitoring Centre
 Saola Conservation in Central Vietnam—Center for Biodiversity and Conservation, American Museum of Natural History

Bovines
Mammals described in 1993
Mammals of Laos
Mammals of Vietnam